A Fight to the Finish may refer to:
 A Fight to the Finish (1937 film)
 A Fight to the Finish (1925 film)